Pyrenacantha is a genus of plant in family Icacinaceae. It has about 20 species, all from the Old World tropics.

List of selected species
 Pyrenacantha acuminata Engl.	
 Pyrenacantha ambrensis Labat, El-Achkar & R.Rabev.
 Pyrenacantha andapensis Labat, El-Achkar & R. Rabev.	
 Pyrenacantha brevipes Engl.	
 Pyrenacantha capitata H.Perrier	
 Pyrenacantha chlorantha Baker
 Pyrenacantha cordicula Villiers
 Pyrenacantha malvifolia Engl.
 Pyrenacantha volubilis William Jackson Hooker, 1830. (type species)

References 

 
Taxonomy articles created by Polbot
Asterid genera